Yaroslav Makushinsky (born 5 March 1998) is a Belarusian professional footballer who plays for Energetik-BGU Minsk.

References

External links 
 
 

1998 births
Living people
People from Kalinkavichy District
Sportspeople from Gomel Region
Belarusian footballers
Association football defenders
FC Dinamo Minsk players
FC Slavia Mozyr players
FC Lokomotiv Gomel players
FC Smolevichi players
FC Belshina Bobruisk players
FC Vertikal Kalinkovichi players
FC Energetik-BGU Minsk players